Danail Bachkov  (Bulgarian: Данаил Бачков; born 21 December 1976)  is a former Bulgarian professional footballer who played as a right-back and a football manager who currently manages Levski Karlovo. Bachkov was capped two times for the Bulgarian national team.

Coaching career
On 16 June 2017, Bachkov was appointed as manager of Third League club Minyor Pernik  He was sacked in November following a streak of poor results.

Honours
 Levski Sofia
Bulgarian Cup (1): 2003

References

External links
 
 Profile at Levskisofia.info 

1976 births
Living people
Bulgarian footballers
Bulgaria international footballers
FC Spartak Plovdiv players
PFC Lokomotiv Plovdiv players
PFC Levski Sofia players
PFC Cherno More Varna players
PFC Rodopa Smolyan players
FC Sportist Svoge players
First Professional Football League (Bulgaria) players
Association football defenders
Bulgarian football managers
Footballers from Plovdiv